Pantanal is a Brazilian telenovela produced and broadcast by TV Globo. It premiered on 28 March 2022, and ended on 7 October 2022. It is written by Bruno Luperi and is based on the 1990 telenovela of the same name, created by Benedito Ruy Barbosa. It stars Marcos Palmeira, Dira Paes, Jesuíta Barbosa, Irandhir Santos, and Alanis Guillen.

Plot 
Joventino, one of the greatest farmers in the Pantanal, disappears without a trace and abandons his son, José Leôncio. Five years later, on a trip to Rio de Janeiro, José Leôncio falls in love and marries Madeleine. The two move to the Pantanal, where their son, Jove, is born. Madeleine misses her life in the city and does not accept the fate of loneliness that comes with being a farmer's wife. With her husband always on the road, she is forced to live with Filó, a maid whom she knows little and does not trust. Madeleine doesn't understand José Leôncio's relationship with Filó and Tadeu, Filó's son and godson of José Leôncio. What Madeleine does not know is that Filó was a prostitute with whom José Leôncio had a relationship on one of his trips in the past.

Madeleine flees the Pantanal taking Jove, still a baby, to her family's mansion. Jove grows up out of sight of his father, who found himself unable to fight for custody of his son. José Leôncio has never failed to meet his legal obligations, sending monthly alimony. Jove grows up believing that his father is dead, while José Leôncio finds an heir in Tadeu. Some years after Madeleine's departure, Filó confesses that Tadeu is also José Leôncio's son. Despite their joy at the revelation, the three of them keep the information a secret. Thus, Tadeu remains only as the godson of his boss, which hurts him deeply.

Twenty years later, Jove discovers that his father is alive and goes in search of him, in a reunion marked by a big party. Although happy with the moment, José Leôncio and Jove face an abyss of behavioral and cultural differences, while Jove deals with Tadeu's jealousy. To complete the family turmoil, at one point, everyone is surprised by the arrival of a third son who vies for the love and admiration of this father: José Lucas de Nada. José Lucas arrives at the farm by the hand of fate and discovers the family ties he never had. In the midst of the events, Jove and Juma Marruá fall in love. The daughter of Maria Marruá and Gil, Juma does not open her guard to anyone and has learned from her mother to defend herself from the "animal men", the most dangerous species that can prowl the abandoned village where she lives. The "animal men" took her whole family. Thus, she became a wild and distant woman. Despite their differences, Jove and Juma live an intense passion.

Cast

Main 

 Marcos Palmeira as José Leôncio
 Renato Góes as Young José Leôncio
 Drico Alves as Teen José Leôncio
 Fred Garcia as Child José Leôncio
 Dira Paes as Filomena "Filó" Aparecida
 Leticia Salles as Young Filó
 Jesuíta Barbosa as Joventino "Jove" Leôncio Neto
 Guilherme Tavares as Child Jove
 Irandhir Santos as José Lucas de Nada
 Alanis Guillen as Juma Marruá
 Valentina Oliveira as Child Juma
 Murilo Benício as Tenório
 Osmar Prado as Velho do Rio
 Irandhir Santos as Velho do Rio (first phase)
 Selma Egrei as Mariana Braga Novaes
 Camila Morgado as Irma Braga Novaes
 Malu Rodrigues as Young Irma
 Juliano Cazarré as Alcides
 Julia Dalavia as Maria "Guta" Augusta
 José Loreto as Tadeu Aparecido Leôncio
 Lucas Oliveira dos Santos as Child Tadeu
 Fábio Neppo as Sebastião "Tião"
 Chico Teixeira as Quim
 Caco Ciocler as Gustavo
 Gabriel Stauffer as Young Gustavo
 Isabel Teixeira as Maria Nogueira "Maria Bruaca"
 Silvero Pereira as Zaqueu
 Karine Teles as Madeleine Braga Novaes
 Bruna Linzmeyer as Young Madeleine
 Gabriel Sater as Trindade
 César Ferrario
 Aline Borges as Zuleica Gonçalves
 Leandro Lima as Levi
 Gabriel Santana as Renato "Reno" Gonçalves Nogueira
 Cauê Campos as Roberto "Beto" Gonçalves Nogueira
 Lucci Ferreira
 Mareliz Rodrigues
 Paula Barbosa as Zefa
 Lucas Leto as Marcelo Gonçalves Nogueira
 Guito as Tibério
 Bella Campos as Maria Rute "Muda"
 Túlio Starling as Francisco "Chico" Marruá
 Victoria Rossetti as Nayara
 Almir Sater as Eugênio Chalaneiro

Guest stars 
 Juliana Paes as Maria Marruá
 Enrique Díaz as Gil
 Leopoldo Pacheco as Antero Novaes
 Paulo Gorgulho as Ceci
 Giovana Cordeiro as Generosa
 Orã Figueiredo as Reginaldo
 Jackson Antunes
 Erom Cordeiro as Lúcio
 Cláudio Galvan as Ari
 Romeu Benedicto as Anacleto

Production 
On 6 September 2020, TV Globo announced that it would be producing a new version of Pantanal. Bruno Luperi, grandson of Benedito Ruy Barbosa, was announced as writer of the new version. Filming began in August 2021. Filming of the first part of the series ended in December 2021.

Casting 
The first cast members of the series were announced in July 2021. On 19 September 2021, Alanis Guillen was confirmed in the leading role.

Ratings

References

External links 
 

TV Globo telenovelas
Brazilian telenovelas
Portuguese-language telenovelas
2020s Brazilian television series
2022 Brazilian television series debuts
2022 Brazilian television series endings
2022 telenovelas
Television series about shapeshifting